NUTV at the University of Calgary is one of the oldest university-based television production societies in Canada. Established in 1983 and incorporated in 1991, NUTV is a campus-based non-profit organization that offers opportunities to University of Calgary students and community members to explore the medium of television by learning the various stages of production. These opportunities include reporting/interviewing, hosting, writing, camera operation, lighting, sound mixing, using Final Cut Pro & Adobe Creative Suite, editing, producing, and directing. NUTV is part of the University of Calgary Tri-Media Alliance, composed of print (The Gauntlet), radio (CJSW 90.9), and television (NUTV). The University of Calgary is unique in that it is one of only two Canadian universities that house three media operations on-campus, the other being the University of Toronto Mississauga's UTM/TV.

History

NUTV: A brief history of time & space

1984
 UCTV formed as a University of Calgary student club
 Universitility - first show produced

1986
 UCTV receives first student levy ($2.75)

1987
 Universitility - first broadcast on Rogers Cable Channel 10
 Producer becomes the first staff member of UCTV

1990
 UCTV receives first levy increase ($0.25)

1991–1992
 UCTV incorporated on September 23, 1991 as a registered non-profit organization. Name changed to New University Television (NUTV)
 NSF replaces Universitility as the news magazine show

1992-1993
 Producer becomes a permanent staff position
 Voices studio talk show airs as an alternating program
 Betacam SP equipment purchased

1993–1994
 On-line edit suite MATROX
 Part-time Technical Director staff position added
 NSF broadcast on Rogers Cable channel 10
 NSF wins AMPIA award for best Community Cable Program

1994–1995
 Technical Director staff position converted to full-time
 Program Director title is added to the Producer position

1995–1996
 Executive Producer position becomes Executive Director position
 NUTV programming broadcast on SHAW cable channel 10

1996 -1997
 Pilot soap opera 2500 University Drive produced
 NUTV holds first Casino night and upgrades office computers
 Full Frontal NUTV becomes the standard name for the news magazine program

1998–1999
 Research into closed-circuit programming begins
 closed-circuit equipment purchased
 Edit system moves into new office in the upstairs of MacEwan Student Centre

1999-2000
 NUTV programming moves to SHAW cable channel 66
 First AVID non-linear edit suite purchased

2000-2001
 Second AVID edit system and new cameras are purchased
 Part-time Closed-Circuit Coordinator staff position created 
 Interactive video booth SpeakTank installed on campus

2001 - 2002
 NUTV receives second levy increase ($0.50) which is used to launch Closed-Circuit programming on campus
 Full Frontal NUTV episode pulled from SHAW cable after airing piece on Puppetry of the Penis

2002 - 2003
 Full Frontal NUTV wins The Alliance for Community Media: Best of the Northwest Award for Excellence
 Campus Tri-Media Alliance creates Movies That Matter (MTM) series featuring political and socially relevant documentaries 
 NUTV joins Calgary Dollars

2003 - 2004
 Documentary School program starts with seed money from AMAAS (Alberta Media Arts Alliance Society)
 Movies That Matter wins the Fast Forward Weekly (FFWD) Best of Calgary Award 

2005 - 2006
 National Film Board of Canada involved in Documentary School workshop 
 Construction begins on the new NUTV studio space in MacEwan Student Centre

2006 - 2007
 NUTV moves into new permanent studio space on the 3rd floor of MacEwan Student Centre
 Content produced by NUTV doubles
 All Closed-Circuit monitors on campus upgraded to energy efficient HD LCD screens 
 Editing systems upgraded from AVID to Final Cut Pro

2007- 2008
 Purchase of video switcher for NUTV:LIVE web broadcasts
 First "live-webstreaming" broadcast featuring DINOS basketball game 
 Purchase of Sony HD Camera
 Co-hosted the Tri-Media The New Media: Thriving in a Digital Age conference with CJSW and the Gauntlet 
 Dino_Myte web show begins showcasing DINOS athletes 
 NUTV programming broadcast on SHAW cable channel 89

2008 - 2009
 NUTV receives third levy increase ($1.00)
 CBC sponsors prize for NUTV Documentary School
 Fourth full-time staff member added as Closed-Circuit position transformed into Director of Publicity & Promotions
 NUTV programming returns to SHAW cable 10
 Full Frontal NUTV wins The Alliance for Community Media: Hometown Video Award in the Magazine Shows category

2011
NUTV hosts the first annual Greenlight Arts Festival (GAF), a festival encouraging awareness and activism on social issues.

2014
NUTV discontinues Full Frontal, and launches its new talk show, Studio 315.

2015
NUTV hosts the Greenlite Arts Festival with the theme of footprints. The festival encourages awareness and activism.

Programming

The majority of NUTV programming is produced by the volunteer members with NUTV staff giving guidance for quality and content. NUTV encourages a forum for a free exchange of ideas and opinions and provides a voice to individuals and groups without the constraints of for-profit media.

Greenlite Festival
Greenlight Arts Festival is an annual festival started in 2011 to raise issues surrounding environmentalism. The Festival hosts several events that are part of the green art movement, starting with a 48-Hour Eco Film Challenge and a Photography Competition. The festival's mandate is to provide opportunities for students to dialogue about environmental issues, develop technical skills, engage their creativity and facilitate the production of film and photographic work. Taking place in the last week of March the festival serves to jump start Earth Week and consists of various environmentally themed activities including; digital photography competition; 48-hour film challenge; digital filmmaking workshops; environmental documentary screening with panel discussion; daily shorts exhibition; and a closing gala. All activities are free and open to student and community members.

NUTV and the Students’ Union Sustainability Board both contribute funding and resources towards the success of the festival.

Awards
 Alberta Film & Television "Rosie" Award - for Please Stand By
 Alberta Film & Television "Rosie" Award - for Field Mice
 Hometown Video Awards for Community Television Programming - for Full Frontal NUTV

Equipment
NUTV has industry standard equipment and offers all members professional training sessions throughout the year, including orientation covering all of NUTV's production and post production equipment. To operate NUTV's cameras and edit systems members must be proficient on that piece of equipment.

Cameras 

NUTV has a Sony F350 XDCAM HD camera, two Sony EX1 XDCAM HD cameras, two Sony DSR 300 DVCAM cameras, and a Sony three chip mini DV camera to shoot the bulk of production.

Edit Suites 

NUTV has two Final Cut Pro editing systems and an Adobe Creative Suite multimedia edit system with which members can also create graphics and animation.

Famous alumni
NUTV has been the training ground for many individuals wishing to break into the television and film industry.

Michael Dowse- director of FUBAR (2002) & It's All Gone Pete Tong (2004). "I started at the University of Calgary and worked at the University of Calgary television station (NUTV), which was a great place." Excerpt from The young, the restless, and the dead: interviews with Canadian filmmakers by George Melnyk (2008) (p. 4)
Gary Burns- director of waydowntown and Radiant City.

References

University of Calgary
Student television stations in Canada